Mifflin-Juniata Career and Technology Center is a comprehensive vocational education facility, serving around 500 high school students from public and private schools in Mifflin and Juniata counties in Pennsylvania. The school is located just outside Lewistown, the county seat of Mifflin County.

School history
Mifflin-Juniata Career and Technology Center, built in 1968, is situated on approximately 20 acres and consists of the 81,136 square-foot school and an annex of 1,966 square feet.  Most instructional areas include both classroom and laboratory/shop areas.

School operation and sending districts
The Mifflin-Juniata Career and Technology Center is jointly operated by the Juniata and Mifflin County School Districts.  Students completing at least grade nine from one of five sending high schools comprise the school's population. Students attending non-public schools in Juniata and Mifflin Counties are also eligible to attend Mifflin-Juniata Career and Technology Center.   Enrollment averages about 500 students annually.

Sending high schools
 Mifflin County High School
 East Juniata Junior/Senior High School
 Juniata High School
 Belleville Mennonite School

Program areas
There are 12  programs at MJCTC, they include:
 Agriculture Technology
 Auto Mechanics
 Collision Repair
 Child Care
 Construction (Residential)
 Installation (Electrical)
 Cosmetology
 Culinary Arts
 Health Professions
 Metalworking
 Criminal Justice / Police Science
 Allied Health Science

Clubs and activities
There are three clubs  in which students can participate in. They include:
 Future Farmers of America (FFA)
 Health Occupations Students of America (HOSA)
 Skills USA
FFA and SkillsUSA have been in existence  since the school opened in 1968.

References

Vocational education in the United States